This is a list of places which are named or renamed after Vladimir Ilyich Ulyanov, better known by his alias Lenin. Some or all of the locations in former Soviet republics and satellites were renamed (frequently reverting to pre-Soviet names) after the fall of the Soviet Union, while Russia and aligned countries (mainly Belarus) retained the names of the thousands of streets, avenues, squares, regions, towns, and cities that were given Lenin's name as part of his cult of personality.

Cities, towns, settlements and districts

Former Soviet Union

Azerbaijan
Ilyich (1924–1990) — Şərur, Nakhchivan Autonomous Republic
Lenin, Leninkend, and Leninfeld — Çinarlı, Shamkir
Leninabad —   Kərimbəyli, Babek
Leninabad — Yeni yol, Shamkir
Leninabad — Sanqalan
Leninabad — Təklə, Gobustan
Leninavan — Həsənqaya, Tartar
Leninkənd — Qarakeçdi
Leninkend — Mustafabəyli
Port-İliç — Lankaran Rayon, now called Liman
Pamyat' Lenina — Balıqçılar

Armenia
Leninakan (1924–1990) — Gyumri

Kazakhstan
Leninsk (1958–1995) — Baikonur
Leninogorsk (1941–2002) — Ridder

Kyrgyzstan
Lenin (Leninskoye)
Leninjol (1937–1991) — Masy
Leninpol (?–2001) — Bakay-Ata

Moldova
 Lenin, Transnistria, a commune in Transnistria

Russia
Leninaul, a town in Dagestan
Leningori (1924?-1990) — Akhalgori/Leningor (from 1990), South Ossetia
Leningrad (1924–1991) — St. Petersburg
Leningrad Oblast, a federal subject 
Leninkent, a town in Dagestan
Leninogorsk, Republic of Tatarstan, founded in 1948
Leninsk, a town in Volgograd Oblast
Leninsk, an urban-type settlement in Chelyabinsk Oblast
Leninsk (1918–1929) — Taldom, Moscow Oblast
Leninsk-Kuznetsky, Kemerovo Oblast, known as Kolchugino before 1925
Leninskaya Sloboda, a town in Nizhny Novgorod Oblast
Gorki Leninskiye, Moscow Oblast, known as Gorki before 1924
Leninskoye, a town in Kirov Oblast
Leninskoye, a town in Leninsky District in Jewish Autonomous Oblast
Leninsky, a town in Leninsky District in Tula Oblast
Leninsky, a town in Yakutia
Novo-Lenino, a district in Irkutsk
Ulyanovsk, Russia — known as Simbirsk before 1924
Leninsky District in several federal subjects (disambiguation page)

Tajikistan
Leninabad (1936–1992) — Khujand
Leningrad or Leningradskiy — Muminabad

Ukraine 
Illichivsk (1952–2016) — Chornomorsk, Odessa Oblast
Lenin Raion, Sevastopol

Uzbekistan
Leninsk (?-?) — Asaka

Eastern Europe

Hungary
Leninváros (1970–1991) — Tiszaújváros

Streets and squares
Almost every town in the Soviet Union had a street named after Lenin. After the collapse of the Soviet Union, some of streets and squares (primarily outside of Russia and Belarus) reverted to their former names or were given new ones. In Russia, there are still 5,000 streets named after Lenin. This concerns also the names of city districts. Listed below are some of the streets named after Lenin, with an emphasis on those outside of the former USSR or its Eastern Bloc.

On 15 May 2015 President of Ukraine Petro Poroshenko signed a bill into law that started a six months period for the removal of communist monuments and the mandatory renaming of settlements and (the many) streets and squares with names related to the communist regime. Places in Crimea, the Donetsk People's Republic, and Luhansk  People's Republic were not practically affected by this law due to their occupation by Russia.

Former Soviet Union

Armenia
Lenini hraparak (Lenin Square) – now Independence Square, Gyumri
Lenini hraparak (Lenin Square), 1940–1990 – now Republic Square, Yerevan 
Lenini poghota (Lenin Avenue), 1924–1990 – now Mashtots Avenue, Yerevan

Azerbaijan
Lenin meydanı (Lenin Square) – now Azadliq Square, Baku

Belarus
Lieninski praspiekt (Lenin's Avenue), 1961–1991 – now Independence Avenue, Minsk
Vulica Lienina (Lenin Street), Brest
Vulica Lienina (Lenin Street), Grodno
Vulica Lienina (Lenin Street), Minsk 
Plošča Lienina (Lenin Square), Brest
Plošča Lienina (Lenin Square, metro station), Minsk
Praspiekt Lienina (Lenin Avenue), Gomel
Praspiekt Lienina (Lenin Avenue), Zhodzina

Estonia
Lenini prospekt (Lenin Prospekt), 1950–1994 – now Joala tänav, Narva
Lenini puiestee (Lenin Avenue), ?–1991 – now Pikk tänav, Pärnu
Lenini puiestee (Lenin Avenue), 1950–1991 – now Rävala puiestee, Tallinn
V. I. Lenini puiestee (V. I. Lenin Avenue) – now Viru puiestee, Sillamäe
Lenini tänav (Lenin Street), 1951–1990 – now Uus tänav, Kuressaare
Lenini tänav (Lenin Street), ?–1989 – now Kesktänav, Põltsamaa
Lenini tänav (Lenin Street), ?–1994 – Tapa
Lenini tänav (Lenin Street), ?–1989 – now Kesktänav and Riia tänav, Valga
Lenini tänav (Lenin Street), ?–1990 – now Jüri tänav, Võru
Lenini väljak (Lenin Square), ?–1991 – now Riiamäe plats, Tartu
V. I. Lenini tänav (V. I. Lenin Street), ?–1992 – now Jaama tänav, Jõhvi

Georgia
Leninis Moedani (Lenin Square) – now Freedom Square, Tbilisi

Kazakhstan
Prospekt Lenina (Lenin Avenue), 1919–1995 – now Dostyq Avenue, Almaty
Prospekt Lenina (Lenin Avenue), Karaganda

Latvia
Ļeņina iela (Lenin Street), 1950–1991 – now Brīvības iela, Riga
Ļeņina prospekts (Lenin Avenue), 1960–1990 – now Lielā iela, Jelgava

Lithuania
Lenino aikšte (Lenin Square), 1952–1991 – now Lukiškės Square, Vilnius
Lenino prospektas (Lenin Avenue), ?–1989 – now Vytauto prospektas, Kaunas
Lenino prospektas (Lenin Avenue), 1961–1989 – now Gediminas Avenue, Vilnius

Moldova
Strada Lenin (Lenin Street), 1944–1952 and Bulevardul Lenin (Lenin Boulevard), 1952–1990 – now Bulevardul Ștefan cel Mare și Sfînt, Chișinău
Strada Lenin (Lenin Street), Comrat

Russia
Leninskaya Ploshchad (Lenin Square) – now Paveletskaya Ploshchad, Moscow
Ploshchad Lenina (Lenin Square), Arkhangelsk
Ploshchad Lenina (Lenin Square), Nizhny Novgorod
Ploshchad Lenina (Lenin Square), Novosibirsk
Ploshchad Lenina (Lenin Square), Saint Petersburg
Leninsky Prospekt (Lenin Avenue), Moscow
Prospekt Lenina (Lenin Avenue), Elektrostal
Prospekt Lenina (Lenin Avenue), Murmansk
Prospekt Lenina (Lenin Avenue), Nizhny Novgorod
Prospekt Lenina (Lenin Avenue), Volgograd
Prospekt Lenina (Lenin Avenue), Yekaterinburg
Lenina ulitsa (Lenin Street) – now Kremlinskaya Ulitsa, Kazan
Lenina ulitsa (Lenin Street), Pechory
Lenina ulitsa (Lenin Street), Saint Petersburg
Leninskaya Ulitsa (Lenin Street), Samara
Ulitsa Lenina (Lenin Street), Astrakhan
Ulitsa Lenina (Lenin Street), Perm
Ulitsa Lenina (Lenin Street), Novosibirsk

Tajikistan
Prospekt Lenina (Lenin Avenue), 1961–1992 – now Rudaki Avenue, Dushanbe

Ukraine
Ploshchad Lenina (Lenin Square), Donetsk
Prospekt Lenina (Lenin Avenue), Alchevsk
Prospekt Lenina (Lenin Avenue), 1959–1990 – now Svobody Prospekt, Lviv
Prospekt Lenina (Lenin Avenue), 1960–2016 – now Prospekt Miru, Mariupol
Prospekt Lenina (Lenin Avenue), 1960–2016 – now Tsentralnyi Prospekt, Mykolaiv
Prospekt Lenina (Lenin Avenue), ?–2016 – now Sobornyi Prospekt, Oleksandriia
Prospekt Lenina (Lenin Avenue), 1952–2016 – now Sobornyi Prospekt, Zaporizhia
Vulytsya Lenina (Lenin Street) – now Vulytsya Yevheniya Kharchenka, Kyiv
Vulytsya Lenina (Lenin Street), ?–1994 – now Vulytsya Rishelievska, Odessa

Uzbekistan
V.I. Lenin nomidagi maydon (V.I. Lenin Square), 1956–1991 – now Mustaqillik Maydoni, Tashkent

Eastern Europe

Bulgaria
Bulevard V.I. Lenin (Lenin Boulevard) – now Tsarigradsko shose, Sofia
Ploshtad Lenin (Lenin Square) – now Ploshtad Sveta Nedelya, Sofia

Czechoslovakia
Leninova ulice (Lenin Street) — now Evropská třída, Prague
Leninova ulice (Lenin Street) — now Kounicova ul., Brno
Leninova ulice (Lenin Street) — now Klišská ul., Ústí nad Labem
Leninova ulice (Lenin Street) — now ul. Palackého, Plzeň
Leninova ulice (Lenin Street) — now ul. E. Beneše, Písek
Leninova ulice (Lenin Street) – now Nádražní, Krnov
Leninovo nábrežie (Lenin riverbank) — now Nábrežie Jána Pavla II., Poprad
Ulica V. I. Lenina (V. I. Lenin Street) — Šoporňa
Leninova (Lenin (metro station)) – now Dejvická, Prague
Leninova (Lenin Street) – now Hlavná ulica, Košice

Hungary
Lenin körút (Lenin boulevard) – now Tisza Lajos körút, Szeged 
Lenin körút (Lenin boulevard) – now Erzsébet körút and Teréz körút, Budapest
Lenin tér (Lenin square) – now Hatvani kapu tér, Eger

Poland
Aleja Lenina (Lenin Avenue) – now Aleja Henryka, Chrzanów
Aleja Lenina (Lenin Avenue) – now Aleja Jana Pawła II, Częstochowa
Aleja Lenina (Lenin Avenue) – now Ulica Chorzowska, Świętochłowice
Ulica Lenina (Lenin Street), 1949–1990 – now Ulica Jana Klemensa Branickiego, Białystok
Ulica Lenina (Lenin Street) – now Ulica Andersa, Tychy
Ulica Lenina (Lenin Street) – now Ulica Brata Alberta, Warsaw
Aleja Włodzimierza Lenina (Vladimir Lenin Avenue), 1958–1991 – now Aleja Solidarności, Kraków
Aleja Włodzimierza Lenina (Vladimir Lenin Avenue) – now Aleja Mieczysława Smorawińskiego and Aleja Generała Władysława Andersa, Lublin
Ulica Włodzimierza Lenina (Vladimir Lenin Street) – now Ulica Henryka Le Ronda, Katowice
Ulica Włodzimierza Lenina (Vladimir Lenin Street) – now Ulica Armii Krajowej, Kołobrzeg
Ulica Włodzimierza Lenina (Vladimir Lenin Street) – now Ulica Stróżowska, Sanok

Romania
Strada V.I. Lenin (V.I. Lenin Street) – now Strada Revoluției, Târgu Mureş
Bulevardul Lenin (Lenin Boulevard) - now Bulevardul 21 Decembrie 1989, Cluj-Napoca
Strada V.I. Lenin (V.I. Lenin Street) – now Strada Mihai Eminescu, Timișoara

Slovakia
Leninová (Lenin Street), Veľké Úľany
V.I. Lenina (V.I. Lenin Street), Šoporňa
Leninová (Lenin Street), Bušince

Western Europe

France
Avenue Lénine (Lenin Avenue), Achères, Yvelines
Avenue Lénine (Lenin Avenue), Bègles
Avenue Lénine (Lenin Avenue), Fontaine
Avenue Lénine (Lenin Avenue), Gentilly
Avenue Lénine (Lenin Avenue), Gonfreville-l'Orcher
Avenue Lénine (Lenin Avenue), Lanester
Avenue Lénine (Lenin Avenue), Pierrefitte-sur-Seine
Avenue Lénine (Lenin Avenue), Romainville
Avenue Lénine (Lenin Avenue), Saint-Denis
Avenue Lénine (Lenin Avenue), Saint-Pierre-des-Corps
Avenue Lénine (Lenin Avenue), Villejuif
Avenue Vladimir Illitch Lénine (Lenin Avenue), Nanterre
Avenue Vladimir Illitch Lenine (Vladimir Ilich Lenin Avenue), Arcueil
Avenue Vladimir Illitch Oulianov Lénine (Lenin Avenue), Lorient
Boulevard Lénine (Lenin Boulevard), Argenteuil
Boulevard Lénine (Lenin Boulevard), Bobigny
Boulevard Lénine (Lenin Boulevard), Eymoutiers
Boulevard Lénine (Lenin Boulevard), Saint-Étienne-du-Rouvray
Boulevard Lénine (Lenin Boulevard), Tremblay-en-France
Boulevard Lénine (Lenin Boulevard), Vénissieux
Passerelle Lénine (Lenin footbridge), Bègles
Passerelle Lénine (Lenin footbridge), Alès
Place Lénine (Lenin Square), Bègles
Place Lénine (Lenin Square), Bezons
Place Lénine, Champigny-sur-Marne / France
Place Lénine, Saint-Junien / France
Rue Lénine (Lenin Street), Bagnolet
Rue Lénine (Lenin Street), Blainville-sur-Orne
Rue Lénine (Lenin Street), Fenain
Rue Lénine (Lenin Street), Ivry-sur-Seine
Rue Lénine (Lenin Street), L'Île-Saint-Denis
Rue Lénine (Lenin Street), La Courneuve
Rue Lénine (Lenin Street), Longueau
Rue Lénine (Lenin Street), Montataire
Rue Lénine (Lenin Street), Montigny-en-Gohelle
Rue Lénine (Lenin Street), Nauroy
Rue Lénine (Lenin Street), Neuf-Mesnil
Rue Lénine (Lenin Street), Persan
Rue Lénine (Lenin Street), Petite-Forêt
Rue Lénine (Lenin Street), Portes-lès-Valence
Rue Lénine (Lenin Street), Saint-Cyr-l'École
Rue Lénine (Lenin Street), Saint-Martin-d'Hères
Rue Lénine (Lenin Street), Somain
Rue Lénine (Lenin Street), Thenon
Rue Lénine (Lenin Street), Unieux
Rue Lénine (Lenin Street), Vierzon
Rue Lénine (Lenin Street), Viry-Châtillon
Cité Lénine (Housing project), 68 av de la République, Aubervilliers, Seine-Saint-Denis, Paris

Finland
Lenininpuisto (Lenin Park), Helsinki

Germany
Leninallee (Lenin Avenue) – now Landsberger Allee, Berlin
Leninallee (Lenin Avenue), Cottbus
Leninallee (Lenin Avenue) – now Lindenallee, Eisenhüttenstadt
Leninallee (Lenin Avenue) – now Am grünen Tal, Schwerin
Leninallee (Lenin Avenue) – now Zeppelinstraße, Potsdam
Leninallee (Lenin Avenue) – now Merseburger Straße, Halle
Leninallee (Lenin Avenue) – now Talstraße, Meissen
Leninallee (Lenin Avenue), Stendal
Leninplatz (Lenin Square) – now Platz der Vereinten Nationen (United Nations Square), Berlin
Leninplatz (Lenin Square) – now Wiener Platz (Vienna Square), Dresden
Leninplatz (Lenin Square), Borne, Saxony-Anhalt
Leninplatz (Lenin Square), Bützow
Leninplatz (Lenin Square), Edderitz
Leninplatz (Lenin Square), Ostrau (Petersberg, Saxony-Anhalt)
Leninplatz (Lenin Square), Falkensee
Leninplatz (Lenin Square), Könnern
Leninstraße (Lenin Street) – now Prager Straße (Prague Street), Leipzig
Leninstraße (Lenin Street), Weißenfels, Saxony-Anhalt
Leninstraße (Lenin Street), Etgersleben
Leninstraße (Lenin Street), Premnitz
Leninstraße (Lenin Street), Saubach
Leninstraße (Lenin Street), Teutschenthal
Leninstraße (Lenin Street), Zschornewitz

Italy
Via Lenin (Lenin Street), Bibbiano, Reggio Emilia
Piazza Lenin (Lenin Square), Cavriago
Piazza Lenin (Lenin Square), Scicli
Via Lenin (Lenin Street), Capraia e Limite
Via Lenin (Lenin Street), Castiglione del Lago
Via Lenin (Lenin Street), Caorso, Piacenza
Via Lenin (Lenin Street), Chiusi
Via Lenin (Lenin Street), Castelvetro di Modena
Via Lenin (Lenin Street), Carpi
Via Lenin (Lenin Street), Concordia sulla Secchia, Modena
Via Lenin (Lenin Street), Cosenza
Via Lenin (Lenin Street), Ferrara
Via Lenin (Lenin Street), Garlasco, Pavia
Via Lenin (Lenin Street), Lecce
Via Lenin (Lenin Street), Lula
Via Lenin (Lenin Street), Marsciano
Via Lenin (Lenin Street), Mede, Pavia
Via Lenin (Lenin Street), Melendugno, Lecce
Via Lenin (Lenin Street), Modena
Via Lenin (Lenin Street), Monticelli d'Ongina, Piacenza
Via Lenin (Lenin Street), Misterbianco, Catania
Via Lenin (Lenin Street), Monsummano Terme, Pistoia
Via Lenin (Lenin Street), Panicale
Via Lenin (Lenin Street), Paullo
Via Lenin (Lenin Street), Pisa
Via Lenin (Lenin Street), Quattro Castella, Reggio Emilia
Via Lenin (Lenin Street), Rome
Via Lenin (Lenin Street), San Giuliano Terme, Pisa
Via Lenin (Lenin Street), San Polo d'Enza, Reggio Emilia
Via Lenin (Lenin Street), San Stino di Livenza, Venezia
Via Lenin (Lenin Street), Spoleto
Via Lenin (Lenin Street), Zibido San Giacomo, Milan
Viale Lenin (Lenin Avenue), Bologna
Viale Lenin (Lenin Avenue), Castel Volturno
Viale Lenin (Lenin Avenue), Genzano di Roma
Viale Lenin (Lenin Avenue), Palma di Montechiaro
Viale Lenin (Lenin Avenue), Suzzara

United Kingdom
Lenin Terrace, Chopwell / England
Lenin Terrace, Stanley / England
Bevin Court, London, England, was originally intended be called Lenin Court. However, two letters of the building's sign were replaced to rename it after Ernest Bevin who died between its completion and inauguration. A bust of Lenin in the grounds was left in place, but was eventually removed after having been repeatedly vandalised by anti-communists.

Africa

Angola
Avenida Lenin (Lenin Avenue), Luanda

Benin
Place Lenin (Lenin Square), Cotonou

Mozambique
Avenida Vladimir Lenine (Vladimir Lenin Avenue), Maputo

South Africa
Lenin Street, Alberton

Somalia
Via Lenin (Lenin Street), Mogadishu

Tunisia
Rue Lénine (Lenin Street), Tunis

Asia

India
Lenin Sarani (Lenin Street), Kolkata
Lenin Street, Kolkata
Lenin Street, Erode
Lenin Street, Pondicherry, Puducherry
Lenin Centre, Vijayawada, Andhara Pradesh
 Lenin Chowk, Muzaffarpur

Malaysia
Lenin River, a river in the interior of Sarawak

Vietnam
Lenin Park, Hanoi / Vietnam - now Reunification Park
Lenin Flower Garden, Hanoi
Suối Lenin (Lenin stream), Pắc Pó, Cao Bang

Places and parks

Eastern Europe

Azerbaijan
Lenin rayonu (Lenin city district), Baku

Belarus
Leninskiy rayon (Ленинский район ~ Lenin city district), Minsk

Czech Republic
Závody V. I. Lenina (V. I. Lenin Works) – now Škoda Plzeň, Plzeň 
Muzeum V. I. Lenina (V. I. Lenin Museum) – now Lidový dům ČSSD (People's House of ČSSD), Prague

Estonia
Lenini rajoon (Lenin city district), Tallinn - later Lõunarajoon (Southern district), now restructured

Russia
Leninskiye gory (Ленинские горы ~ Lenin Hills) – now reverted to their historic name Sparrow Hills (Воробьевы горы), Moscow / Russia
Leninskiy rayon (Ленинский район ~ Lenin city district) in the following cities;
Astrakhan
Barnaul
Cheboksary
Chelyabinsk
Grozny
Irkutsk
Ivanovo
Izhevsk
Kaluga
Kemerovo
Kirov
Komsomolsk-na-Amure
Krasnoyarsk
Magnitogorsk
Makhachkala
Murmansk
Nizhniy Novgorod
Nizhniy Tagil
Novosibirsk
Omsk
Orenburg
Orsk
Penza
Perm
Rostov-na-Donu
Samara
Saransk
Saratov
Smolensk
Stavropol
Tambov
Tomsk
Tyumen
Ufa
Ulyanovsk
Vladimir
Vladivostok
Voronezh
Yaroslavl 
Yekaterinburg

Tajikistan
Lenin Peak,  – now Avicenna Peak

Romania
Raionul Lenin (Lenin city district), Bucharest

Ukraine
V.I. Lenin Memorial Chernobyl Nuclear Power Station (Chernobyl Nuclear Power Plant), Pripyat

Central America/Caribbean

Cuba
Parque Lenin, Havana / Cuba

Other
A large number of enterprises and other objects in the former Soviet Union and other countries of the Soviet bloc were named after Lenin: for example, the nuclear-powered icebreaker Lenin and Lenin Stadiums in many towns and cities. Additionally, every reasonably large settlement had a Lenin Street or Lenin Avenue ("Prospekt Lenina/Leninsky Prospekt"), or a Lenin Square.

See also
Leninsky Prospekt
List of places named after Joseph Stalin
List of statues of Joseph Stalin
List of statues of Vladimir Lenin
Lenin's Mausoleum
List of renamed cities and towns in Russia
List of things named after Fidel Castro

References

Lists of places named after people
Lists of things named after politicians
Places
Soviet Union-related lists
City name changes